The Book of Imaginary Beings was written by Jorge Luis Borges with Margarita Guerrero and published in 1957 under the original Spanish title Manual de zoología fantástica. The subsequent English version contains descriptions of 120 mythical beasts from folklore and literature, and was praised upon its release.

Contents 
The book contains descriptions of 120 mythical beasts from folklore and literature. In the preface, Borges states that the book is to be read "as with all miscellanies... not... straight through... Rather we would like the reader to dip into the pages at random, just as one plays with the shifting patterns of a kaleidoscope"; and that "legends of men taking the shapes of animals" have been omitted. Although a work of fiction, it is situated in a tradition of Paper Museums, bestiaries, and natural history writing.

Development 
It was expanded in 1967 and 1969 in Spain to the final El libro de los seres imaginarios. The English edition, created in collaboration with translator Norman Thomas di Giovanni, contains descriptions of 120 mythical beasts from folklore and literature. A similar book, The Book of Barely Imagined Beings, was also later authored by Caspar Henderson.

Reception 
A review from Publishers Weekly praised the book, describing it as "perfect foils for classic Borgesian musings on everything from biblical etymology to the underworld, giving the creatures particularly vivid and perfectly scaled shape". Reviewing the book for The Guardian, Caspar Henderson stated that the book was brief but also a  "map of the endless labyrinth of human imagination and its contents" that was "dense and deep". The reviewer also commented that the entries on legends were "delightful". Benjamin DeMott in The New York Times also complimented the book, stating that it was "an amusing tribute to the human gift for seeing the invisible and debating whether it whistles". An article in Journal of Modern Literature, written by Melanie Nicholson, reported that some critics described the book as a "curious but unoriginal compilation of already-told tale". However, Nicholson stated that it was also "one worthy of serious consideration".

See also 
 Anthrozoology
 Celestial Emporium of Benevolent Knowledge
 Meinong's jungle
 Peryton

References 

Works by Jorge Luis Borges
1957 books
1969 books
Bestiaries
Argentine speculative fiction works
Works about legendary creatures
Roc (mythology)